Chemical Science is a weekly peer-reviewed scientific journal covering all aspects of chemistry. It is the flagship journal of the Royal Society of Chemistry. It was established in July 2010 and is published by the Royal Society of Chemistry; before 2018, it was published monthly. It won the Best New Journal 2011 award from the Association of Learned and Professional Society Publishers. The editor-in-chief is Andrew Ian Cooper (University of Liverpool).

In January 2015, the journal moved to an open access publishing model.

Abstracting and indexing
The journal is abstracted and indexed in:
Science Citation Index Expanded
Current Contents/Physical, Chemical & Earth Sciences
Chemical Abstracts Service
Directory of Open Access Journals
According to the Journal Citation Reports, the journal has a 2021 impact factor of 9.969.

See also 

 Chemical Communications
 Chemical Society Reviews

References

External links 
 

Monthly journals
Chemistry journals
Royal Society of Chemistry academic journals
Publications established in 2010
English-language journals
Creative Commons Attribution-licensed journals